Miguel Torrejos Tanfelix (born September 21, 1998) is a Filipino actor.

Tanfelix received his breakthrough performance when he played the role Niño , a mentally challenged boy in the series Niño (2014). He is also known for the afternoon drama Wish I May (2016) opposite Bianca Umali, and as Young Pagaspas in the hit GMA fantasy series Mulawin (2004).

Early and personal life
Tanfelix was born on September 21, 1998, in Dasmariñas, Cavite. He is the eldest of the two children of Mary Grace Torrejos and Gary Tanfelix who are both educators and mountaineers. Although they live in Cavite, where Tanfelix attends regular school, the family also keeps a home in Parañaque to lessen Tanfelix's traveling time when he is filming. Tanfelix finished high school at Cavite School of Life (Dasmariñas Campus) and is now currently studying entrepreneurship at De La Salle University-Dasmariñas.

Tanfelix dated actresses Barbie Forteza from 2012 to 2014, Bianca Umali from 2014 to 2017, and Kyline Alcantara from 2017 to 2018.

Tanfelix was hired by the Commission on Population (POPCOM) as celebrity ambassador for U4U, a youth initiative whose stated mission is to provide Filipino teenagers with critical information on delaying sexual debut and preventing sexually transmitted infections.

Career

2004–2013: StarStruck Kids

Tanfelix was five years old when he joined the kid version of the reality-based artista search StarStruck in 2004. It was the artista search that made Jennylyn Mercado and Mark Herras (the show's very first winners) household names. Proclaimed as the season's First Prince, Tanfelix later joined the cast of the hit fantaserye Mulawin as Young Pagaspas. The following year, Tanfelix played the role of Rainier Castillo's younger version of Jimboy/Erastus in the 2006 fantaserye Majika, and played Pepe Javier in the afternoon drama Now and Forever: Linlang.

From 2007 to 2012, Tanfelix portrayed the younger roles of some of the lead characters in several GMA series. He was Young Aldrin Griego in Pati Ba Pintig ng Puso, Young Junjun in La Vendetta, and Langit sa Piling Mo'''s Young Thirdy among others.

2014–2016: Big Break; Niño

In 2014, Tanfelix received his biggest break to date when he was given the titular role of Niño. His portrayal as a mentally challenged boy received three different acting nominations from PMPC Star Awards for TV, PEP List Awards and Golden Screen TV Awards. The same year, Tanfelix joined Sunday All Stars as a co-host and a performer. Tanfelix also starred in the comedy sitcom Ismol Family with his love team Bianca Umali.

Tanfelix led his second Primetime series, Once Upon a Kiss, during the first three months of 2015. He also co-hosted the sixth season of the reality-talent search StarStruck where he first started his showbiz career. In 2016, Tanfelix once again starred in a leading role with Bianca Umali in the afternoon drama Wish I May''.

2015: Dubsmash: Twerk It Like Miley

In July 2015, Tanfelix became popular in Indonesia, Malaysia, and Timor Leste because of his viral Dubsmash video of Brandon Beal's hit song Twerk It Like Miley. Tanfelix was featured in an Indonesian newspaper, "Sumatera Ekspres" twice. He has also received several invitations to travel to Indonesia for a TV guesting and show. Tanfelix has a strong following in Indonesia, evident in his social media posts which include Bahasa (Indonesian) language comments. Tanfelix gained 300k+ followers on his social media accounts, most of them Indonesian. Because of his popularity in Indonesia, he was compared to Indonesian actor and singer Aliando Syarief. Tanfelix also recorded many video collaborations with Bacun Hakim, an Indonesian actor and host.

Filmography

Television

Television series

Television shows

Drama anthologies

TV specials

Movies

Awards and nominations

References

External links
 

Filipino male film actors
1998 births
Living people
People from Dasmariñas
Male actors from Cavite
Tagalog people
Filipino male television actors
Filipino male child actors
21st-century Filipino male actors
Participants in Philippine reality television series
StarStruck Kids participants
GMA Network personalities
Filipino television variety show hosts